Orejuela is a surname. Notable people with the surname include:

Antonio Orejuela (born 1960), Spanish footballer
Carlos Orejuela (born 1980), Peruvian footballer
Carlos Alfredo Orejuela Quiñónez (born 1993), Ecuadorian footballer
Diego Orejuela (born 1962), Spanish footballer
Gilberto Rodríguez Orejuela (born  1939), Colombian drug lord
Eduardo Orejuela (born 1952), Ecuadorian swimmer
Jefferson Orejuela (born  1993), Ecuadorian footballer
Luis Manuel Orejuela (born 1995),  Colombian footballer
Miguel Rodríguez Orejuela (born  1943), Colombian drug lord
Tamara Orejuela (born 1953), Ecuadorian swimmer
Yuri Alvear Orejuela (born 1986), Colombian judoka

See also 
Orjuela, another spelling of it
Sachatamia orejuela,  is a species of frog in the family Centrolenidae

References